The Alabama A&M Lady Bulldogs basketball team is the basketball team that represents Alabama Agricultural and Mechanical University in Normal, Alabama.  The school's team currently competes in the Southwestern Athletic Conference.

History
The Bulldogs played in the Southern Intercollegiate Athletic Conference from 1947 to 1998 before joining the SWAC. They have made two NCAA Tournament appearances, both being in Division II, which they lost in the First Round both times.

NCAA Division II Tournament appearances

References

External links